Hendrik Klaas Aldert "Henk" Visser (born 19 June 1930) is a Dutch pediatrician. He was professor of pediatrics at the Erasmus University Rotterdam and the Erasmus MC between 1967 and 1995.

Life
Visser was born on 19 June 1930 in Dokkum. He studied medicine at the University of Groningen between 1948 and 1955. He specialized in pediatrics under professor J.H.P. Jonxis. Visser obtained his PhD in 1958. From 1960 to 1961 he was a postdoctoral research fellow at the Boston Children's Hospital.

Visser became professor of pediatrics at the Erasmus University Rotterdam and the Erasmus MC in 1967. Visser was dean of the faculty of Medicine from 1986 to 1990. He retired in 1995. 

Visser was elected a member of the Royal Netherlands Academy of Arts and Sciences in 1980. In 1997 he was awarded the Gorterpenning by the Nederlandse Vereniging voor Kindergeneeskunde. 

Visser was the first chairman of the Dutch  from April 1st 1999 to June 1st 2003. In this period the Dutch  was introduced.

References

1930 births
Living people
Dutch pediatricians
Academic staff of Erasmus University Rotterdam
Members of the Royal Netherlands Academy of Arts and Sciences
People from Dokkum
University of Groningen alumni